Rudolf Amann (born 3 June 1961) is a German microbiologist and director at the Max Planck Institute for Marine Microbiology (MPIMM) in Bremen, and since 2001 Professor of Microbial Ecology at the University of Bremen.

Scientific career 
Between 1980 and 1986 Amann studied biology and chemistry at the Technical University of Munich (TU Munich), Germany, after which he was a PhD student at the local Department of Microbiology until 1988. In 1988 he received his doctorate from Professor Karl-Heinz Schleifer on the topic "The beta subunit of ATP synthase as a phylogenetic marker in the eubacteria". After a postdoctoral stay at the departments for Veterinary Pathobiology and Microbiology at the University of Illinois in Urbana-Champaign, USA, in 1990 he joined Professor David A. Stahl as assistant professor at the Department of Microbiology at the Technical University of Munich, Germany. In 1995, Amann habilitated at the Technical University of Munich about the identification of previously non-cultivable microorganisms. Since then he has been doing research at the interface between ecology and taxonomy.

From 1997 to 2001, Amann was head of a Max Planck Research Group at the Max Planck Institute for Marine Microbiology in Bremen, Germany. In 2001, he became a Scientific Member of the Max Planck Society and Director at the Max Planck Institute for Marine Microbiology, Bremen, Germany. Since then, he has headed the Department of Molecular Ecology. In the same year (2001), he was appointed Professor of Microbial Ecology at the University of Bremen, Germany. Since 2002 he is also spokesman for the International Max Planck Research School of Marine Microbiology. From 2014 to 2017 he was chairman of the Biological-Medical Section of the Max Planck Society.

Amann is a member of several professional societies, including the Association for General and Applied Microbiology (VAAM), the American Society for Microbiology (ASM), the International Society for Microbial Ecology (ISME) and the European Academy of Microbiology (EAM). In 2007 he became a member of the National Academy of Sciences Leopoldina. As a reviewer, Amann is primarily active for the German Research Foundation (DFG, selected peer-reviewer 2004–2012) and the European Research Council (ERC). He is co-editor of the journal Systematic and Applied Microbiology.

Prof. Dr. Rudolf Amann has received numerous scientific awards, including the Bergey's Award of the Bergey's Manual Trust, USA (2004), the Lecturer's Prize of the Fonds der Chemischen Industrie (1998) and the Körber European Science Prize of the Körber Foundation (1995).

Research interests 
Amann researches the diversity and ecology of microorganisms in marine habitats. He developed molecular techniques to identify and quantify bacteria and archaea. His methods, using nucleic acid probes, have contributed to the discovery of new, previously uncultivated species of microorganisms. His research focuses on the role of microorganisms in global biogeochemical cycles such as the carbon cycle. Amann researches both bacteria and archaea in marine sediments and in the water column. A current focus of his work is on the interaction of phytoplankton and bacterioplankton, which are often controlled by algal polysaccharides as energy sources for heterotrophic bacteria.

His group has optimized a detection method that can be used to determine the bacterial composition of environmental samples – the so-called fluorescence in situ hybridization (FISH). This method identifies microorganisms based on the sequence of their ribosomal RNA. Specially stained nucleic acid probes bind only to bacteria with a specific RNA. These bacteria can then be identified and counted under the microscope.

As a researcher in the field of biodiversity, Rudolf Amann is also committed to an integrative taxonomy that builds a bridge to other disciplines. Amann calls for a multidisciplinary approach to better understand and classify relationships between genes, organisms and ecosystems with the methods of modern genome research.

References

1961 births
German bacteriologists
German ecologists
German marine biologists
German microbiologists
Living people
Academic staff of the University of Bremen
Max Planck Institute directors